Rocky LaPorte is an American actor and a stand-up comedy performer.It is said that  He was born in Chicago Illinois but Wikipedia doesn't really know because on the title of this report it is written that he was born in Brooklyn NYC. In 2005 he had his own stand-up special on Comedy Central Presents. After the comedian Tim Allen watched Rocky on The Tonight Show, he claimed Rocky as his "favorite new comic" and brought him on to play in his movie The Shaggy Dog. Rocky visited Iraq with Drew Carey and the trip became a Showtime movie called "Patriot Act: a Jeffrey Ross Home Movie" which aired on Showtime. He was also one of the few comedians to get a standing ovation on the Tonight Show with Jay Leno.

Rocky was a finalist in the eighth season of NBC's Last Comic Standing finishing in the top five, Rocky qualified to perform on the Last Comic Standing Tour, which took place in the Fall of 2014.

Filmography
The Pat Sajac Show 1989
The Magic Johnson Show 1989
1989 Johnnie Walker National Comedy Search (1989)
Cheers (episode: Ma Always Liked You Better, 1990)
Evening at the Improv (1989, 1991, 1992 )
Carolines Comedy Club Hour, ( 1989, 1990 )
The Tonight Show with Jay Leno (episode: 6 October 2004)
Comedy Central Presents: Rocky LaPorte (2005)
Patriot Act: A Jeffrey Ross Home Movie (2005)
Just for Laughs (episode:  20 November 2005)
The Shaggy Dog (2006)
The Godfathers Of Comedy. (2009 )
The Very Funny Show (2009)
crazy on the outside, movie with Tim Allen  2010  
Last Comic Standing (2014)
Ron White, Salute to the Troops. CW   TV  2015

References
Review,  Rocky La Porte at Improv Comedy Club on the Waterfront, Homestead, Pennsylvania
Rocky on Comedy Central

External links
Rocky Laporte's Website.    Www.Rocky LaPorte.com. 

Video of Rocky's act

Living people
American male comedians
21st-century American comedians
Year of birth missing (living people)